In the span of 21 days in February 2006, three men were shot to death in Broward County, Florida. The motive in each case was robbery. Video surveillance of two people using the victims' credit cards was examined, and on February 26, police arrested Bahamian native Brian Bethell and his girlfriend Natasha Edwards when they were positively identified as the individuals in the video. Bethell, who confessed, would die before his trial could begin. Edwards was convicted in June on the theft charges and was sentenced to 10 years imprisonment.

Murders
On January 20, 2006, Brian Bethell robbed two vacationing doctors at gunpoint, telling them both to hand over their wallets, cell phones, and car keys. Both men obliged and netted Bethell $600, and he left both men unharmed. On February 3, Bethell spotted Angel Pedro Medina a 41-year-old accountant at a convenience store in Fort Lauderdale, and proceeded to follow him in his car to a spot where Medina was known to bring food to feed local homeless people. Once both confronted one another, Bethell attempted to rob Medina, during which he shot and killed Medina, and fled the scene. 

On February 10, Bethell spotted 63-year-old retired businessman Albert Avenaim outside a restaurant in Hallandale. Bethell approached Avenaim in the parking lot and robbed him, not long after shooting and killing him. Within hours after Avenaim's murder, Bethell, Edwards, and her two children, were spotted on surveillance cameras with Avenaim's credit card in multiple shops in Plantation, Sunrise, Margate, and finally in Carol Springs. On February 24, Bethell approached a condo at around 7 p.m. As he walked, he noticed 76-year-old Frederick Gunther, and promptly shot and killed him.

A test of the gun that killed Avenaim, which was a 38-caliber revolver, was compared to the gun used to kill Medina, and it was a match. Investigators got a tip when workers from a store in Fort Lauderdale spotted a couple using Gunther's credit card, and they gave the police the tag number on their vehicle. The couple was tracked down, and their identity was proved to be Bethell and Edwards, and both were arrested.

Perpetrator
Brian Ricardo Bethell (April 1965 – June 15, 2010) was a native of Nassau, Bahamas. 

Bethell was arrested in March 1983, a month prior to his 18th birthday, on charges of sexual assault and battery with a deadly weapon, for which he was sentenced to four years in prison. Upon getting out, Bethell was arrested two more times for marijuana possession and loitering. In 1990, he was again arrested in Tallahassee, Florida for larceny and cocaine possession, for which he served a year in jail. In 1994, Bethell was under arrest again, this time in Leon County, for marijuana possession, and was given a year of probation.

In 1997, Bethell was detained by Hollywood police on charges of assaulting a police officer, as well as other drug offenses. He was not given time in prison and instead was given probation. In 2001, Bethell was once again arrested for cocaine and marijuana possession. In 2005, he rented a place at the 400th block of Southwest 65th avenue with 20-year-old Natasha Rashone Edwards and her two young children. By later accounts from his neighbors, they described Bethell as someone with a mean look and a loud mouth.

Criminal charges
Bethell was indicted on three counts of first-degree murder, while Edwards was charged with grand theft. In a jail call with her great-grandmother, Edwards was reportedly crying, exclaiming that "I didn't do it, Brian did". Edwards was convicted in June on the theft charges and was sentenced to 10-years imprisonment. Bethell didn't shift responsibility away and admitted to each of the killings, but claimed the first murder, that of Angel Medina, was in self-defense, something Medina's family denied. On June 15, 2010, Bethell died at age 45 before his trial could begin. On May 1, 2015, Edwards was released from prison after serving nine years. Her current whereabouts are unknown.

See also 
 Recidivism (The act of an offender often re-offending)

References

External links
 Murder suspect has long record
 Florida officials arrest man in death of former resident
 Alert store workers get money for suspect's catch

2006 murders in the United States
2006 in Florida
Attacks in the United States in 2006
Burglary
February 2006 crimes
February 2006 events in the United States
Robberies in the United States